Silas Namatak is a Ni-Vanuatu footballer who plays as a midfielder. for Amicale F.C and the Vanuatu National Football team.

References 

Living people
1990 births
Vanuatuan footballers
Vanuatu international footballers
Tafea F.C. players
2012 OFC Nations Cup players
Association football midfielders